Dindigul Thalappakatti Restaurant (also known as Thalappakatti Biriyani) is a restaurant chain that operates primarily in the Indian state of Tamil Nadu. The first outlet was opened in 1957 at Dindigul. Since then, it operates with over 101 outlets globally with 92 outlets in India, and 9 outlets overseas. The Thalappakatti restaurants focus on biryani as the core product.

History 
The founder, Nagasamy Naidu, started Dindigul Thalappakatti restaurant by the name of Anandha Vilas Biriyani Hotel in Dindigul, Tamil Nadu. In 2013 the chain won a trademark lawsuit about the use of the word "thalappakatti" (meaning "turban" in Tamil).

Locations
Dindigul Thalappakatti Restaurant has 101 restaurants, with 92 outlets in India & 9 overseas outlets in countries like Sri Lanka, the United Arab Emirates, Malaysia, Singapore and the United States.

References

External links 
 Official website – India
 Official website – USA
 Official website – UAE

Restaurant chains in India
South Indian cuisine
Companies based in Chennai
1957 establishments in Madras State
Indian companies established in 1957
Restaurants established in 1957